USS ARL-5 was one of 39 Achelous-class landing craft repair ships built for the United States Navy during World War II.

Originally laid down as LST-81 on 8 March 1943 at Jeffersonville, Indiana by the Jeffersonville Boat & Machine Company; launched on 28 May 1943; sponsored by Miss Bettie Meador; and commissioned on 21 July 1943. She was decommissioned on 19 July 1943, and redesignated ARL-5 on 20 July 1943.

On 29 July 1943, she was transferred to the United Kingdom and served the Royal Navy as HM LSE-1 until 21 May 1946, when she was returned to the United States. She was struck from the Naval Vessel Register on 29 October 1946.

On 20 August 1947, LST-81 was sold to Argentina and served that government as ARA Ingeniero Hodesh (Q-21), then renamed ARA Ingeniero Iribas (Q-21). She was sold by the Argentine Navy in 1967.

References
 
 

 

Achelous-class repair ships
Achelous-class repair ships converted from LST-1-class ships
Ships built in Jeffersonville, Indiana
1943 ships
World War II auxiliary ships of the United Kingdom
Ships transferred from the United States Navy to the Royal Navy